The American Athletic Conference basetball tournament is the conference championship tournament in college baseball for the American Athletic Conference. It is a round-robin tournament, with seeding based on regular season records. The winner receives the conference's automatic bid to the NCAA Division I Baseball Championship each season. The Tournament champion is separate from the conference champion. The conference championship is determined solely by regular season record.

The American is one of two successors to the original Big East Conference, which split after the 2013 season. The tournament was held in the same location as the previous six Big East Conference baseball tournaments in 2014, at Bright House Field in Clearwater, Florida.

Format
Unlike the previous Big East Tournament, the American adopted a round-robin tournament format in 2014. The top eight teams were divided into two groups of four, with each team facing the others in the group. The winners of each group then faced off in a single championship game. This format was similar to the format used by several new members from the Conference USA baseball tournament from 2010 to 2013.

In 2015, the event reverted to the traditional two-bracket, double-elimination tournament leading to a single championship game.

Champions

By year

By school
This table of championship statistics is updated after each event.  It is current as of the end of the 2022 Tournament.

Italics indicate school no longer sponsors baseball in the American.

References

 
2014 establishments in Florida
Recurring sporting events established in 2014
Baseball in Florida
College sports in Florida
Sports in Clearwater, Florida
Sports competitions in Florida
Tourist attractions in Pinellas County, Florida